Planotortrix octoides is a species of moth of the family Tortricidae. It is endemic to New Zealand, where it has been recorded from the Chatham Islands only.

The wingspan is 18–26 mm.

The larvae are polyphagous. They have a pale grey-green body and a brown head.

References

Moths described in 1990
Archipini
Moths of New Zealand
Endemic fauna of New Zealand
Endemic moths of New Zealand